The Charleston Rebels were a minor league baseball club that existed between 1940 and 1952 in Charleston, South Carolina. The club was a member of the South Atlantic League and played its home games at College Park. The club was affiliated with the Pittsburgh Pirates and Chicago White Sox of Major League Baseball. However the club was also briefly affiliated with Atlanta Crackers in 1948.

Seasons

Baseball teams established in 1940
Baseball teams disestablished in 1953
Defunct minor league baseball teams
Pittsburgh Pirates minor league affiliates
Chicago White Sox minor league affiliates
South Atlantic League (1904–1963) teams
Defunct baseball teams in South Carolina
Defunct South Atlantic League teams